Inija Trinkūnienė (born October 25, 1951, in Kelmė) is a Lithuanian ethnologist, folklorist, sociologist, psychologist, head of folk music group Kūlgrinda and the high priestess (krivė) of the Romuva community of the old Lithuanian faith. She became the high priestess after the death of the previous high priest (krivis) and her husband Jonas Trinkūnas in 2014. She is a founding member of the European Congress of Ethnic Religions. She holds a master's degree in psychology from Vilnius University.  She was a featured speaker in the Indigenous Plenary Session at the Parliament of the World Religions in Toronto in 2015.

References

See also 
2015 Address to 2015 Parliament of World Religions on YouTube.

1951 births
Living people
Lithuanian ethnologists
Lithuanian folklorists
Lithuanian modern pagans
People from Kelmė
Vilnius University alumni
Performers of modern pagan music
Modern pagan religious leaders
Kūlgrinda (band) members